Star Jasper (born December 3, 1966) is an American actress.

Early life and education
Jasper was born in Brooklyn. Her father, Leonard Jasper, was a New York City developer.  Her mother, Marion Ellner, a fine artist, has retired to Panama.

Star graduated from Long Island University. She studied acting at Richmond College in London and at Lee Strasberg Theatre and Film Institute in New York City.

Career
She has appeared in a number of films including True Love, Jersey Girl, Pushing Tin, Mortal Thoughts and A Walk on the Moon. She has many television credits to her name, including Law & Order, Brooklyn South, Murder One, and Diagnosis Murder.

Personal life
Jasper is married to Chris Seefried, musician and singer in the rock band Gods Child. She currently resides in Los Angeles.

References

External links

1966 births
Living people
American film actresses
American television actresses
Actresses from New York City
Long Island University alumni
21st-century American women